Thomas Henry Knight Moulder (25 May 1872 – 9 June 1920) was a Guyanese first-class cricketer.

Moulder was born at Georgetown in British Guiana in May 1872. He played three first-class cricket matches for Demerara in the 1891–92 Inter-Colonial Tournament, playing twice against Barbados and once against Trinidad. He scored 101 runs in his three matches, with a high score of 51. He later played minor counties cricket in England for Oxfordshire between 1896–1902, making eighteen appearances in the Minor Counties Championship. He died in June 1920.

References

External links

1872 births
1920 deaths
People from Georgetown, Guyana
Guyanese cricketers
Demerara cricketers
Oxfordshire cricketers